The 1989 NCAA Division I softball tournament was the eighth annual tournament to determine the national champion of NCAA women's collegiate softball. Held during May 1989, twenty Division I college softball teams contested the championship. The tournament featured eight regionals of either two or three teams, each in a double elimination format. The 1989 Women's College World Series was held in Sunnyvale, California from May 24 through May 28 and marked the conclusion of the 1989 NCAA Division I softball season.  For the second consecutive year, UCLA won the championship by defeating  1–0 in the final game.

This was the last WCWS before it moved to its current home in Oklahoma City, Oklahoma.

Qualifying

Regionals

Regional No. 1

UCLA qualifies for WCWS, 2–0

Regional No. 2

Oklahoma State qualifies for WCWS, 2–0

Regional No. 3

Fresno State qualifies for WCWS, 2–0

Regional No. 4

Cal Poly Pomona qualifies for WCWS, 2–0

Regional No. 5

First elimination round
Connecticut 1, Massachusetts 0
Oregon 2, Massachusetts 0
Connecticut 2, Oregon 1

Second elimination round

Oregon qualifies for WCWS, 3–1

Regional No. 6

First elimination round
Arizona State 2, Utah State 0
Arizona 8, Utah State 3
Arizona 3, Arizona State 2 (10 innings)

Second elimination round

Arizona qualifies for WCWS, 3–0

Regional No. 7

First elimination round
Creighton 6, Toledo 0
Toledo 1, Iowa 0
Creighton 6, Iowa 1

Second elimination round

Toledo qualifies for WCWS, 3–1

Regional No. 8

First elimination round
South Carolina 2, Florida State 1 (10 innings)
Louisiana Tech 3, Florida State 1
South Carolina 3, Louisiana Tech 1

Second elimination round

South Carolina qualifies for WCWS, 3–1

Women's College World Series

Participants

UCLA

Game results

Bracket

Championship Game

All-Tournament Team
The following players were named to the All-Tournament Team

See also
Women's College World Series
NCAA Division II Softball Championship
NCAA Division III Softball Championship
College World Series

References

1989 NCAA Division I softball season
NCAA Division I softball tournament